The Xijiao Line of the Beijing Subway is a light rail line in Haidian District of Beijing. It opened on 30 December 2017. The line is operated by Beijing Public Transit Tramway Co. Ltd. a subsidiary of Beijing Public Transport Holdings, Ltd. which runs Beijing's Buses.

Fare 
The Xijiao line uses the same fare system as other lines, but the transfer between the Xijiao line and Line 10 at Bagou station is not free, and customers transferring are required to pay a separate fare. Fares start at ¥3 and the maximum fare is ¥4.

History 
 24 November 2008: Beijing building contract websites began to list bids for construction of a  Xijiao Line with total estimated cost of ¥1 billion. Construction was listed to commence on 1 April 2009 and the projected completion date was 1 November 2010.
 11 December 2008: At the 15th Capital Urban Planning and Construction Design Conference, the Beijing City Planning Committee unveiled plans for the Fangshan, Changping, Xijiao and Shunyi subway lines, and announced that it would strive to build two of the four lines by 2010.
 6 January 2009: The Haidian District government announced that construction of the Xijiao Line would begin in 2009, though the details concerning of the line route, whether the line would be below grade or above the surface, and the number of stations, were still being decided.
 15 January 2009: The Beijing city planning committee unveiled the five stations along route.
 7 January 2010: Commencement of construction set for 2010.
 14 March 2012: The route map and planning program is announced.
 20 October 2017: Construction finishes and trial operations begin.
 30 December 2017: The Xijiao Line opens.

Route 
All stations are located in Haidian District.

Accidents and incidents 
On 1 January 2018, tram XJ003 derailed after a malfunction when exiting Xiangshan station at 2:36 PM with no passengers on board. The tram slid down the tracks with its control lever still at traction position after being lifted back on to the tracks later that day. Xiangshan station stopped service until March 1, 2018.

References 

Beijing Subway lines
Light rail in China
Railway lines opened in 2017
2017 establishments in China
750 V DC railway electrification